TOK10 (pronounced トキオ "Tokio") is a cover album by Japanese band Tokio, released on September 1, 2004. It was released to commemorate the tenth anniversary of the band's debut. The album peaked at first place on the Oricon weekly chart and charted for twelve weeks. Thus far, it is their only album to top the Oricon charts.

Track listing 
 "Namida-kun Sayonara" - 4:07
 Original song by Johnny Tillotson (1966).
 "Bulldog" - 4:16
 Original song by Four Leaves (1977).
 "Yoroshiku Aishuu" - 3:19
 Original song by Hiromi Gō (1974).
 "Dakishimete Tonight" - 4:04
 Original song by Toshihiko Tahara (1988).
 "Gin Giragira ni Sarige naku" - 4:47
 Original song by Masahiko Kondō (1981).
 "100%... So Kamone!" - 5:04
 Original song by Shibugakitai (1982).
 "Kimagure One Way Boy" - 4:44
 Original song by The Good-Bye (1983).
 "Kimi Dake ni" - 4:32
 Original song by Shonentai (1987).
 "Daybreak" - 4:41
 Original song by Otokogumi (1988).
 "Paradise Ginga" - 4:27
 Original song by Hikaru Genji (1988).
 "Lion Heart" - 4:15
 Original song by SMAP (2000).
 "Flower" - 5:32
 Original song by KinKi Kids (1999).
 "Wa ni Natte Odorou" - 5:27
 Original song by Agharta (May 1997) Famously Covered by V6 (July 1997).
 This version of the song uses a layered/modified version of the Drum Track from Michael Jackson's "They don't Care about us".
 "Love You Only" - 4:46
 Remix of Tokio's debut single.

References 

2004 albums
Tokio (band) albums
Covers albums